Pass the Light is a 2015 American faith based film, directed by Malcolm Goodwin and written by Victor Hawks. The film stars Cameron Palatas, Dalpre Grayer, Alexandria DeBerry, Milena Govich, Colby French, Lawrence Saint-Victor, Jon Gries, and Anne Winters. It was released in the United States by DigiNext Films in a limited release on February 6, 2015.

Premise
Pass the Light is the story of Steve Bellafiore (Cameron Palatas), a 17-year-old high school senior who decides to run for Congress in order to protect the faith that he so loves.

Cast
 Cameron Palatas as Steve Bellafiore
 Alexandria DeBerry as Jackie
 Dalpre Grayer as Willy
 Milena Govich as Anne
 Colby French as Pete
 Lawrence Saint-Victor as Trevor
 Jon Gries as Franklin Baumann
 Charlie DePew as Wes
 Anne Winters as Gwen
 Ruby Lewis as Gina Winters
 Samantha Figura as Helen Baumann

Production
The film was written by Broadway actor and screenwriter Victor Hawks; it reportedly took him less than a week to write the screenplay. Hawks then introduced the script to his friend, actor Malcolm Goodwin, who signed on to direct. The film was shot within 17 days in and around Thousand Oaks, California.

Release
The film's United States distribution rights were acquired by DigiNext Films in August 2014. The film was released in select theaters by DigiNext on February 6, 2015.

References

External links
 
 

2015 films
Films about religion
Films about Christianity
Films shot in California
2010s English-language films
American teen drama films
2010s American films